Accessibility for people with disabilities on the Toronto Transit Commission (TTC) system is incomplete but improving. Most of the Toronto subway system was built before wheelchair access was a requirement under the Ontarians with Disabilities Act (ODA). However, all subway stations built since 1996 are equipped with elevators, and elevators have been installed in 44 stations built before 1996 (including 1 station that was expanded in 2002). Over seventy percent (56 of 75) of Toronto's subway stations are accessible. In 2014, the TTC began introducing new low-floor vehicles on its streetcar network. These accessible vehicles ultimately replaced the ageing, non-accessible Canadian and Articulated Light Rail Vehicle streetcars by December 29, 2019. In December 2015, the TTC retired the last of its lift-equipped high-floor buses, which were introduced in 1996, making all TTC bus routes 100% low-floor accessible.

Subway

Vehicles

All TTC trains – the T series, Toronto Rockets and Line 3 Scarborough's S series – offer level boarding for customers with wheelchairs and other accessibility needs. They have priority seating identified in blue, and flip-up benches at designated wheelchair locations in each car. The location of these can be found by an exterior accessible icon beside the door, or on the Toronto Rockets, an additional exterior blue light beside the door.

The T1 series subway cars were the first trains to have:
 wider doorways,
 no centre line vertical stanchion bars.

All trains offer automated station stop announcements and, since 2019, visual side destination and route signs and external pre-boarding announcements broadcasting the route and destination the train is going to. The Toronto Rocket subway cars have twice the accessible seating compared to the T1 and Line 3 trains. The Toronto Rockets have visual displays (showing the next stop along with arrows pointing to which side doors will open on at the next stop) and electronic route maps to assist customers who are hearing-impaired and also verbally announce the side doors will open on at the next stop.

Stations
Accessible stations are equipped with elevators, wide fare gates, and access doors. The TTC provides a phone number, 416-539-LIFT, which provides a recorded message listing any elevators which are out of service.

All five stations on Line 4 Sheppard, opened in 2002, are fully accessible and equipped with elevators.

30 of the 38 stations on Line 1 Yonge–University are accessible:

23 of the 31 stations on Line 2 Bloor–Danforth are accessible:

Two of the six stations on Line 3 Scarborough are fully accessible, while one station is partially accessible:

Planned elevator installation
In a 2015 report, the TTC stated that its target of having all stations accessible by 2020 would not be met and that it could not make all subway stations accessible by 2025 unless full funding was made available by governments. In March 2017, TTC CEO Andy Byford reaffirmed the agency's commitment to meeting the 2025 goal, pointing out that, at one point in its plan, 17 stations will be under construction simultaneously. The completion plan for elevators in remaining stations is as follows: By May 2021, the TTC had revised its target completion date for all stations from 2025 to 2024.

The remaining inaccessible Line 3 Scarborough stations (and ) were not part of the plans as these stations are slated to close permanently in 2023 concurrent with the retirement of Line 3. Until the Line 2 Bloor–Danforth extension opens in 2030, accessible shuttle buses will be used in place of the existing Line 3 train service.

Buses

Since the retirement of the last lift-equipped Orion Vs on December 4, 2015, all 170 bus routes have been 100% accessible, using low-floor buses (Nova Bus LF Series and Orion VII). Not all stops along an accessible route are accessible (in particular, many subway stations where buses terminate are not accessible). The TTC's low-floor buses are identified by blue lights located on both sides of the front route display.

Each bus is equipped with a ramp at the front door and can lower itself at the front door. All buses have two onboard positions to park a wheelchair or scooter. Blue-coloured priority seating is available at the front of the bus for riders with disabilities.

Accessible bus stops are designated with the blue International Symbol of Access (the wheelchair symbol). Narrow sidewalks may make some bus stops unsuitable for ramp boarding, requiring the driver to stop the bus 3 metres away from the stop or to have the passenger board from within a bus shelter. , there are several hundred such stops. The TTC plans to upgrade 180 such stops in 2021 plus another 400 stops by 2025. The City of Toronto will upgrade another 125 stops as part of road construction projects.

Wheel-Trans

The TTC provides Wheel-Trans, a door-to-door accessible transit service, to registered clients who are unable to use the conventional transit system. In some cases, Wheel-Trans buses connect customers from their homes to accessible subway stations allowing the rider to use the conventional system for a portion of their journey. The service was created in 1975 as the challenges for people with accessibility needs became more public, and at a time where the entire surface system ran high-floor vehicles which were inaccessible, and subway stations did not have elevators.

Streetcars
As a result of the 2005 Accessibility for Ontarians with Disabilities Act, which requires all public transport services in Ontario to become accessible by 2025, the TTC began to make its streetcar system wheelchair accessible on August 31, 2014, when the first two new low-floor Flexity Outlook streetcars entered service on the 510 Spadina line. With the retirement of the last high-floor Canadian Light Rail Vehicle (CLRV) streetcars on December 29, 2019, the entire TTC streetcar fleet consisted of accessible Flexity Outlook vehicles.

As the Flexity streetcars are the TTC's first low-floor streetcars, they are accessible for passengers using mobility devices. Only one step is needed to board at any door, and an extendable loading ramp for users in wheelchairs, strollers or other mobility devices is located at the second set of doors of the vehicle. The passenger can signal the operator to deploy the ramp by pressing the blue wheelchair accessibility button by the inside or outside of this door. There are two positions for parking wheelchairs and scooters near the inside of the second door.

The ramp has two modes: if the streetcar stop is alongside a curb or raised platform, only a short portion is extended (the operator can open the ramp either from inside the driver booth or from the outside of the vehicle); if only street level is available, the operator will exit the vehicle and a further length of the ramp would extend to allow access at that level.

All accessible streetcar stops are designated with the blue International Symbol of Access (the wheelchair symbol). A few streetcar stops are not accessible, requiring riders who need the wheelchair ramp to use another stop. All stops along Roncesvalles Avenue are not yet accessible because the platform height at these stops is not yet retrofitted to the Flexity doors. Other stops need the installation of curb ramps. Work to make these stops accessible will be completed by 2022.

Visual impairments
Service animals are allowed on the TTC during all hours of operation.

All stations have yellow warning strips with bumps at the edge of the platforms, and most have tactile floor tiles that assist persons with visual impairments in locating elevators and other accessibility features.

All vehicles are equipped with automated audible stop announcements. Surface vehicles and Toronto Rocket trains also have visual LED stop displays.

In 2015, the TTC tested the new External Route Announcement (ERA) system for buses (similar to the system already in place since 2014 on the commission's Flexity streetcars), that indicates the route, direction and destination as a pre-boarding announcement. The announcements are made through a speaker located on the outside of the vehicle, when the doors are opened. As of 2019, all TTC surface vehicles and subway trains were equipped with this system in compliance with AODA requirements.

MagnusCards
In January 2022, the TTC announced it had partnered with Magnusmode, the provider of MagnusCards – an app which helps guide autistic and neurodiverse persons in everyday life, to make using the TTC easier for these individuals. There are five TTC MagnusCards decks to guide a user on accessing a TTC subway station, subway train, streetcar and bus, and also to advise on fares, on using the TTC customer website and its trip planner, and on contacting TTC Customer Service. The smartphone app offers step-by-step instructions using visual clues, text or audio.

Notes

References

External links
TTC Accessibility

Accessible transportation
Accessibility